Elliot–Buckley House, also known as Riverview, is a historic home located near Marlboro, Ulster County, New York. The house was built about 1843, and is a two-story, "T"-shaped, Picturesque influenced heavy timber frame dwelling with a cross-gable roof.  It has a raised basement and is sheathed in clapboard.  The house was remodeled in the Colonial Revival style and an addition built about 1924.  Also on the property is a contributing octagonal well house.  It was built by Dr. Daniel Elliot, and sold to the Buckley family in 1866.

It was listed on the National Register of Historic Places in 2011.

References

Houses on the National Register of Historic Places in New York (state)
Colonial Revival architecture in New York (state)
Houses completed in 1843
Houses in Ulster County, New York
National Register of Historic Places in Ulster County, New York